The 2013 BRD Arad Challenger was a professional tennis tournament played on clay courts. It was the third edition of the tournament which was part of the 2013 ATP Challenger Tour. It took place in Arad, Romania between 3 and 9 June 2013.

Singles main draw entrants

Seeds

 1 Rankings are as of May 27, 2013.

Other entrants
The following players received wildcards into the singles main draw:
  Patrick Ciorcilă
  Petru-Alexandru Luncanu
  Björn Probst
  Dragoș Torge

The following players received entry from the qualifying draw:
  Marcel-Ioan Miron
  Pere Riba
  Franko Škugor
  Denis Zivkovic

The following players received entry as lucky losers:
  Henri Laaksonen
  Mate Pavić

Doubles main draw entrants

Seeds

1 Rankings as of May 27, 2013.

Other entrants
The following pairs received wildcards into the doubles main draw:
  Alexandru-Daniel Carpen /  Dragoș Cristian Mirtea
  Patrick Ciorcilă /  Victor Crivoi
  Sebastian Krăilă /  Petru-Alexandru Luncanu

Champions

Singles

 Adrian Ungur def.  Marius Copil, 6–4, 7–6(7–3)

Doubles

 Franko Škugor /  Antonio Veić def.  Facundo Bagnis /  Julio César Campozano, 7–6(7–5),4–6, [11–9]

External links
Official Website

BRD Arad Challenger
BRD Arad Challenger
2013 in Romanian tennis